George Lippert (1844, Bavaria – July 1906, Salem, Oregon), was born with three legs and, as was discovered during his autopsy, two hearts. He worked as a curiosity for nearly 50 years, many of them for P. T. Barnum. Although he claimed that his third leg was fully functional until it was fractured in an accident, this has not been firmly established.

In 1898, he began facing competition from a three-legged boy, Sicilian-born Frank Lentini, who was touring with the Ringling Brothers Circus. By 1899 he was penniless, but found a benefactor in a florist named Mary Riggs, with whom he lived in his final years.

He died of tuberculosis in 1906.

The Ronald G. Becker Collection of Charles Eisenmann Photographs, held by Syracuse University, includes a photograph of a painting titled "George Lippert three legged man".

References

1844 births
1906 deaths
People with supernumerary body parts
Sideshow performers